Katherine Hunt  may refer to:

Catherine Hunt (1854–1948), mayor of Colchester, England
Kathryn Hunt, British actress

See also
Hunt (surname)